Mark S. Sanford (born January 5, 1939) is an American politician in the state of North Dakota. He is a member of the North Dakota House of Representatives, representing the 17th district. A Republican, he was first elected in 2010. An alumnus of Minot State University and the University of North Dakota, he was an academic administrator.

References

1939 births
Republican Party members of the North Dakota House of Representatives
Minot State University alumni
Living people
People from McKenzie County, North Dakota
Politicians from Grand Forks, North Dakota
University of North Dakota alumni
21st-century American politicians